The 2013 Tour de Corse, formally the 56. Tour de Corse, was the fifth round of the 2013 European Rally Championship season. Bryan Bouffier took his first ever European Rally Championship (ERC) victory, with the rally also being the first ERC victory for the Peugeot 207 S2000 that he drove. The 2WD category was won by Kornél Lukács in a Citroën C2 R2 MAX, whilst the Production Cup was won by Andreas Aigner in a Subaru Impreza STi R4.

Results

Special stages

References

Corse
Tour de Corse
Tour de Corse